The Guns EP was an EP by Minuit, released after the successful The 88, featuring their highly successful song, "I Hate Guns." It had a video mocking "Are You Being Served?"

The Guns EP was only available for a limited run that sold out in the first week. This won them ‘Best Electronic Release’ at the BNet NZ Music AwardsbNet music awards 2005, on top of a nomination for ‘Breakthrough Artist’ at the Vodafone New Zealand Music Awards.

Track listing 
 I Hate Guns
 The Sum Of Us (Original Mix)
 This Music Is Good For The Species*
 Creeps'n'Freaks'n'you (Agent Alvin Mix Of Am.Em.)
 Species II (Live At Massey Uni 2004)
 I Hate Guns (Live At Rippon 2004)

Alternatively known as Species I

Videos 
 Menace Music Video
 Species II Music Video
 Except You Music Video
 The Living Room Documentary

Minuit (band) albums
2004 EPs